| tries = {{#expr:
 + 8 + 5 + 10 + 8 + 7 + 5 + 11 + 9
 + 7 + 8 + 1 + 9 + 6 + 3 + 8 + 3
 + 9 + 7 + 7 + 4 + 6 + 7 + 6 + 4
 + 8 + 5 + 5 + 6 + 10 + 8 + 12 + 9
 + 8 + 8 + 10 + 8 + 13 + 6 + 11 + 9
 + 7 + 7 + 11 + 6 + 10 + 6 + 5 + 9
 + 8 + 8 + 5 + 7 + 10 + 10 + 10 + 7
 + 2 + 7 + 9 + 6 + 7 + 7 + 4 + 10
 + 8 + 9 + 5 + 9 + 7 + 6 + 7 + 13
 + 6 + 6 + 6 + 7 + 8 + 9 + 3 + 8
 + 8 + 5 + 7 + 3 + 6 + 7 + 6 + 1
 + 7 + 5 + 7 + 2 + 6 + 6 + 9 + 9
 + 3 + 5 + 5 + 10 + 7 + 11 + 5 + 8
 + 9 + 6 + 11 + 2 + 3 + 5 
 + 10 + 3 + 3 + 5 + 2 + 5 + 7 
 + 7 + 4 + 9 + 4 + 9 + 4+ 4 +10
  + 12 + 5 + 10 + 4 + 9 + 13  
 + 6 +7 + 15 + 9 + 4 + 7 + 11 
 + 5 + 2 + 11 + 7 + 7 + 1 + 7 
 + 7 + 5 + 7 + 3 + 12 + 10 + 5 + 6 
 + 4 + 7 + 4 + 4 + 6 + 4 + 4 + 2
 + 3 + 5 + 3 + 7 + 5 + 3 + 8 + 3
 + 5 + 8 + 7 + 4 + 8 + 8 + 8 + 10
 + 2 + 6 + 7 + 5
 + 8 + 9 
 + 8 + 9 + 3 + 7 + 8 + 6 + 7 + 9
 + 4 + 5 + 11
 + 10 + 5 + 12 + 8 + 11 + 6 + 7 + 10
 + 2 + 3 + 3 + 7
 + 4 + 8 + 15 + 4 + 9 + 5 + 6 + 9
 + 7 + 3 + 8 + 8 + 7 + 8 + 7 + 8  
 + 8 + 8 + 6 + 10 + 9 + 17 + 7 + 6  
 + 6 + 5 + 6 + 9 + 4 + 4 + 6 + 11 
 + 11
 + 8
}}
| lowest attendance = 103Loughborough Students v Cambridge23 December 2017
| top point scorer = 262 Will Maisey (Coventry)
| top try scorer   = 21 Sam Baker (Ampthill) James Stokes (Coventry)
| prevseason       = 2016–17
| nextseason       = 2018–19
}}
The 2017–18 National League 1, known for sponsorship reasons as the SSE National League 1 is the ninth season of the third tier of the English rugby union system, since the professionalised format of the second tier RFU Championship was introduced; and is the 31st season since league rugby began in 1987.

Following defeat at Blackheath on 10 March, Fylde are the first team to be relegated.  A week later Coventry became the league champions with five games to go after beating Caldy away on the 17 March.  On 21 April Old Albanian became the second team to go down with a game to go, losing 21-24 away to Plymouth Albion.  The third and final relegation spot went to the taken by Hull Ionians who lost 21-38 away to champions Coventry on 28 April 2018 in front of a divisional record attendance of 3,758.  As champions, Coventry are promoted into the 2018–19 RFU Championship, while relegated sides Fylde and Hull Ionians drop to the 2018–19 National League 2 North, and Old Albanian into the 2018–19 National League 2 South.  

Of further interest were a number of divisional records set or equalled during the course of the season.  These included a record crowd (3,758 at Coventry) and record overall league average attendance (653), while Coventry's promotion meant they now had 3 tier titles (equal with Otley). Ampthill also equalled a more obscure record of four league draws previously achieved by both Wharfedale and Richmond.

Structure
The league consists of sixteen teams with all the teams playing each other on a home and away basis to make a total of thirty matches each. There is one promotion place with the champions promoted to the Greene King IPA Championship. There are usually three relegation places with the bottom three teams relegated to either National League 2 North or National League 2 South depending on the geographical location of the team.

Participating teams and locations
Twelve of the sixteen teams participated in the preceding season's competition. The 2016–17 champions, Hartpury College, were promoted to the 2017–18 RFU Championship, replacing London Welsh who went into liquidation, in the second half of the season, and ceased to exist as a professional team. Due to London Welsh's liquidation only two teams (instead of the usual three) were relegated last season – Macclesfield and Blaydon – both of whom drop to the 2017–18 National League 2 North.

The promoted teams are Bishop's Stortford and Caldy, champions of the 2016–17 National League 2 South and 2016–17 National League 2 North respectively, and Old Elthamians who won the promotion play-off against Sale FC.  National League 1 is the highest level all three of these sides have ever reached.

League table

Fixtures

Round 1

Round 2

Round 3

Round 4

Round 5

Round 6

Round 7

Round 8

Round 9

Round 10

Round 11

Round 12

Round 13

Round 14

Postponed due to bad weather (snow), game rescheduled to 24 February 2018.

Postponed due to bad weather (snow), game rescheduled to 24 February 2018.

Round 15

Postponed due to a frozen pitch, game rescheduled for 24 February 2018.

Round 16

Round 17

 Postponed due to waterlogged pitch.  Game to be rescheduled for 17 March 2018.

 Postponed due to a waterlogged pitch.  Game to be rescheduled for 17 March 2018.

Round 18

 Postponed due to a waterlogged pitch. Match rescheduled for 24 February 2018.

Round 19

 Postponed due to a waterlogged pitch. Game rescheduled for 31 March 2018.

Round 20

Round 21

Round 22

Round 23

Rounds 14, 15 & 18 (rescheduled matches)

Game rescheduled from 13 January 2018.

Game rescheduled from 16 December 2017.

Game rescheduled from 9 December 2017.

Game rescheduled from 9 December 2017.

Round 24

Postponed due to bad weather (snow). Game rescheduled for 31 March 2018.

Postponed due to bad weather (snow). Game rescheduled for 30 March 2018.

Postponed due to bad weather (snow). Game rescheduled for 30 March 2018.

Postponed due to bad weather (snow). Game rescheduled for 17 March 2018.

Postponed due to bad weather (snow). Game rescheduled for 31 March 2018.

Postponed due to bad weather (snow). Game rescheduled for 5 May 2018.

Round 25

Fylde are relegated.

Rounds 17 & 24 (rescheduled matches)

Game rescheduled from 6 January 2018.

Game rescheduled from 6 January 2018.

Game rescheduled from 3 March 2018.  Coventry win league title.

Round 26

Rounds 19  & 24 (rescheduled matches)

Game rescheduled from 3 March 2018.

Game rescheduled from 3 March 2018.

Game rescheduled from 3 March 2018.

Game rescheduled from 3 March 2018.

Game rescheduled from 20 January 2018 but postponed again due to a waterlogged pitch.  Game to be rescheduled for 12 May 2018.

Round 27

Round 28

Round 29

Old Albanian are relegated.

Round 30

Hull Ionians are relegated.  Coventry's attendance of 3,758 is a divisional record.

Round 24 (rescheduled game)

Game rescheduled from 3 March 2018.

Round 19 (rescheduled game)

Game originally rescheduled from 20 January 2018 and then from 31 March 2018.

Attendances

Individual statistics
 Note that points scorers includes tries as well as conversions, penalties and drop goals. Appearance figures also include coming on as substitutes (unused substitutes not included).

Top points scorers

Top try scorers

Season records

Team
Largest home win — 53  pts
68 – 15 Plymouth Albion at home to Fylde on 23 September 2017
Largest away win — 64  pts
64 – 0 Coventry away to Fylde on 14 October 2017
Most points scored — 81
81 – 33 Loughborough Students away to Fylde on 21 April 2018
Most points scored away from home — 81
81 – 33 Loughborough Students away to Fylde on 21 April 2018
Most tries in a match — 11 (2)
Bishop's Stortford at home to Fylde on 7 April 2018
Loughborough Students away to Fylde on 21 April 2018
Most tries in an away match — 11
Loughborough Students away to Fylde on 21 April 2018
Most conversions in a match — 9 (3)
Plymouth Albion at home to Fylde on 23 September 2017
Coventry at home to Ampthill on 9 December 2017
Caldy at home to Loughborough Students on 6 January 2018
Most penalties in a match — 7
Cambridge away to Loughborough Students on 23 December 2017
Most drop goals in a match — 1 (4)
Cambridge away to Fylde on 2 September 2017
Hull Ionians at home to Cambridge on 4 November 2017
Old Albanian at home to Ampthill on 23 December 2017
Hull Ionians at home to Rosslyn Park on 24 February 2018

Attendances
Highest — 3,758
Coventry at home to Hull Ionians on 28 April 2018
Lowest — 103
Loughborough Students at home to Cambridge on 23 December 2017
Highest average attendance — 1,869
Coventry
Lowest average attendance — 257
Loughborough Students

Player
Most points in a match — 26
 Gavin Roberts for Caldy at home to Loughborough Students on 6 January 2018
Most tries in a match — 5
 Ryan Hutler for Bishop's Stortford at home to Fylde on 7 April 2018
Most tries in an away match — 4
 Mark Harrison for Birmingham Moseley away to Esher on 14 October 2017
Most conversions in a match — 9
 Dan Mugford for Plymouth Albion at home to Fylde on 23 September 2017
 Gavin Roberts for Caldy at home to Loughborough Students on 6 January 2018
Most penalties in a match — 6
 Isaac Green for Hull Ionians away to Rosslyn Park on 14 April 2018
Most drop goals in a match — 1 (4)
 Jack Green for Cambridge away to Fylde on 2 September 2017
 Chris Bell for Hull Ionians at home to Cambridge on 4 November 2017
 Tom Bednall for Old Albanian at home to Ampthill on 23 December 2017
 Greg Lound for Hull Ionians at home to Rosslyn Park on 24 February 2018

Notes

See also
 English rugby union system
 Rugby union in England

References

External links
 NCA Rugby

3
National League 1 seasons